Phasianella australis, common names the Australian pheasant, painted lady, and pheasant snail, is a medium-sized to large species of sea snail with a calcareous operculum and a colorfully patterned shell, a marine gastropod mollusc in the family Phasianellidae.

Description
This is the largest shell in the genus Phansianelle, with its height varying between 40 mm and 100 mm. The rather thin shell is elongatedand has a pointed-ovate shape. The conical spire is elevated. The shell contains 7-8 somewhat convex whorls. These are slightly flattened below the sutures. The outer lip is thin. The columella shows more or less a white shining callus. The surface of the shell is variously longitudinally clouded and transversely articulated with red and purple olive on a polished flesh-colored, cream or white ground. The color pattern is extremely variable.

Distribution
This marine species occurs off Australia and Tasmania.

References 

 Rosenberg, G. 1992. Encyclopedia of Seashells. Dorset: New York. 224 pp.
 Wilson, B. (1993). Australian Marine Shells. Prosobranch Gastropods. Kallaroo, WA : Odyssey Publishing. Vol.1 1st Edn

External links
 Australian Govt
 Sea Snails Species
 Australian Government Species Bank
 

Phasianellidae
Gastropods of Australia
Fauna of Western Australia
Gastropods described in 1788
Taxa named by Johann Friedrich Gmelin